The Île de la Jatte or Île de la Grande Jatte is an island in the river Seine, located in the department of Hauts-de-Seine, and shared between the two communes of Neuilly-sur-Seine and Levallois. It is situated at the very gates of Paris, being 7 km distant (in a straight line) from the towers of Notre Dame and 3 km from the Place de l'Étoile. The island, which has about 4,000 inhabitants, is nearly 2 km long and almost 200 m wide at its widest point. Its name translates as "Island of the Bowl" or "Island of the Big Bowl".

It is best known as the setting for Georges Seurat's pointillist oil painting A Sunday Afternoon on the Island of La Grande Jatte (1884-1886), itself the inspiration for the musical Sunday in the Park with George (1984).

History 

He bought the land and created a park which included the island, reachable only by boat. It was moved to the southern end of the island in 1930.

Between 1850 and 1870, Napoléon III and Baron Haussmann further modified the island, and artists began painting there. At the end of the 19th century the island became known for its painters, especially the Impressionists. In addition to Georges Seurat, artist such as Claude Monet, Vincent van Gogh, Alfred Sisley, Charles Angrand, and Albert Gleizes painted scenes of the island.

In June 2009, a walk around the island was established, detailing the works of the Impressionists.

Depictions 

Many artists have painted L’Île de la Grande Jatte:
 Émile Bernard
 Le Pont de fer d’Asnières, 1887, oil on canvas, 45.9 × 54.2 cm, Museum of Modern Art
 Pierre Bonnard
 Les travailleurs à la Grande Jatte, c. 1916–20, oil on canvas, 130 x 160 cm, National Museum of Western Art
 Albert Gleizes
 Les Baigneuses (The Bathers), 1912, oil on canvas, 105 x 171 cm, Musée d'Art Moderne de la Ville de Paris
 L’Île de la Grande Jatte ou Bord de parc avec rivière animée de canots, 1907–09, pastel and ink on paper, 25 × 41.5 cm, private collection
 L’Île de la Grande Jatte, 1908, charcoal and gouache on paper, 25 × 41.5 cm, Musée National d'Art Moderne
 La Seine près de Courbevoie, 1908, oil on canvas, 54 × 65 cm, 
 Claude Monet
 L’île de la Grande Jatte, 1874, oil on canvas, 50 × 70 cm, private collection
 À travers les arbres, île de la Grande Jatte, 1878, oil on canvas, 54 × 65 cm, private collection
 Les rives de la Seine, île de la Grande Jatte, 1878, oil on canvas, 52 × 63 cm, Musée Marmottan
 Printemps à l'Île de la Grande Jatte, 1878, oil on canvas, 50 × 61 cm, National Gallery (Norway)
 
 L’Embâcle de la Seine entre Asnières et Courbevoie, 1891, pastel and graphite on canvas, 51 × 90 cm, Petit Palais
 Georges Seurat
 Baignade à Asnières, 1884, oil on canvas, 201 × 300 cm, National Gallery
 La Seine à Courbevoie ou Paysage à la tourelle, 1884, oil on canvas, 15.5 × 24.5 cm, Van Gogh Museum
 Un dimanche après-midi à l'Île de la Grande Jatte,  1884–86, oil on canvas, 207.5 × 308.1 cm, Art Institute of Chicago
 Temps gris, Grande-Jatte, 1886, oil on canvas, 70.5 × 86.4 cm, Metropolitan Museum of Art
 Le Pont de Courbevoie,  1886–87, oil on canvas 46.4 × 55.3 cm, Courtauld Gallery
 La Seine à la Grande Jatte, 1888, oil on canvas, 65 × 81 cm, Royal Museums of Fine Arts of Belgium
 Alfred Sisley
 L’Île de la Grande Jatte, 1873, oil on canvas, 50 × 65 cm, Musée d'Orsay
 Vincent van Gogh
 La Seine et le pont de la Grande Jatte, 1887, oil on canvas, 32 × 40.5 cm, Van Gogh Museum

Celebrities who have lived on the island

The following celebrities are known to have lived on the island:
 Richard Branson, business magnate, investor, and philanthropist.
 Christian Clavier, actor.
 Alexander Grothendieck, mathematician. 
 Patricia Kaas, singer.
 Jean Reno, actor.
 Yves Rénier, actor.
 Nicolas Sarkozy, politician, 23rd President of France.
 Alessandra Sublet, radio and television host.
 Marco Verratti, football (soccer) player.

References

External links

Jatte
Jatte